Ghencea Cemetery is located in Ghencea neighbourhood of Bucharest, on Ghencea Boulevard, in Sector 6. The cemetery has two sections, civilian and military.

Notable interments 
 Cabiria Andreian Cazacu, mathematician
 Gheorghe Argeșanu, general and statesman
 Grigore Bălan, general in World War II
 Iolanda Balaș, athlete and Olympic champion
 Maria Butaciu, performer of folklore music
 Cornelia Catangă, singer
 Elena Ceaușescu, communist activist and wife of dictator Nicolae Ceaușescu
 Nicolae Ceaușescu, first President of Romania
 Nicu Ceaușescu, communist politician and third son of Nicolae and Elena Ceaușescu
 Mihai Chițac, general and Minister of the Interior
 , folk singer from Sibiu
 Mihai Constantinescu, musician
 Florența Crăciunescu, Olympic athlete
 , composer, conductor, and folklorist
 Ion Dincă, communist politician, Deputy Prime Minister, and Mayor of Bucharest
 Aimée Iacobescu, actress
 Mariana Nicolesco, operatic soprano
 Alexis Nour, journalist, activist, and essayist
 Gheorghe Pintilie, first Director of the Securitate
 Temistocle Popa, composer, musician, and film actor
 Tudor Postelnicu, communist politician, Director of the Securitate, Interior Minister 
 Alexandru Șerbănescu, flying ace in World War II
 Toni Tecuceanu, comedy actor
 Costică Toma, footballer and coach
 Nicolae Tonitza, painter and illustrator
 Corneliu Vadim Tudor, leader of the Greater Romania Party, poet, writer, journalist, and a Member of the European Parliament
 Ilie Verdeț, Prime Minister of Romania

Gallery

References

External links
 
 

Cemeteries in Bucharest